Firdaus Bin Mohamed Kassim is a Singaporean football manager who manages Hougang United.

Career

In 2016, Kassim was appointed assistant manager of Thai side Chainat. After that, he was appointed assistant manager of Singapore. In 2018, he was appointed assistant manager of Laos.

In 2022, Kassim was appointed manager of Hougang United in Singapore, helping them win the 2022 Singapore Cup, their first major trophy.

References

Expatriate football managers in Laos
Expatriate football managers in Thailand
Hougang United FC head coaches
Living people
Singapore Premier League head coaches
Singaporean expatriate football managers
Singaporean expatriate sportspeople in Laos
Singaporean expatriate sportspeople in Thailand
Singaporean football managers
Year of birth missing (living people)